Kent Twitchell (born August 17, 1942, Lansing, Michigan) is an American muralist who is most active in Los Angeles. He is most famous for his larger-than-life mural portraits, often of celebrities and artists. His murals are realism not photorealism according to Twitchell.

Biography
Twitchell's parents, Robert and Doris, were farmers like their parents and grandparents. Kent started doing art when he was three years old. His first mentor was his mother's brother, Angus Berry, who was an eccentric artist. As a kid all through high school he painted signs and lettered trucks for local businesses. He went to Dimondale High School (1957–59) and Everett High School (class of 1960.) He joined the United States Air Force right out of high school at age 17 and was stationed in London, England. He worked as a military artist and had top secret clearance until May 1965 when he was honorably discharged. He worked for J. C. Penney as a display artist (1965–66) in Atlanta, Georgia. Twitchell studied art at East Los Angeles College (AA, 1968), California State University, Los Angeles (BA, 1972), and the Otis College of Art and Design (MFA, 1977). He was active in the creation of the Mural Conservancy of Los Angeles and serves on its advisory board.

In 1980, Twitchell's murals to date, including Bride and Groom and The Freeway Lady, were featured extensively in a documentary, Mur Murs, directed by Agnès Varda.

In 1990 Twitchell married Pandora Seaton, the mother of his two children, Art and Aurora. In 1992, the year his son was born, a court awarded him damages for the destruction of The Freeway Lady.  The mural was later repainted by Twitchell on the campus of Los Angeles Valley College. He was based in Echo Park, California for most of his career, until the 1994 Northridge earthquake destroyed his studio.  Shortly thereafter, Twitchell and his family moved to Northern California.

In 2008 Twitchell settled a lawsuit against the U.S. Government and 12 other defendants (Kent Twitchell v. West Coast General Corp et al.) for painting over his  landmark mural of Edward Ruscha, an important Los Angeles-based Pop artist. The settlement amount – $1.1 million – is believed to be the largest settlement ever under the seldom-invoked Federal Visual Artists Rights Act (VARA) or the California Art Preservation Act (CAPA). VARA and CAPA forbid desecration, alteration, or destruction of certain public works of art without prior notice to the artist to allow for removal.

Twitchell had a show in Los Angeles in April 2009 at the LOOK gallery entitled "Thriller: The King of Pop Meets the King of Cool: Exploring the Lost Works of Kent Twitchell." The exhibition included sketches, photos and drawings for "lost" murals, as well as one that was completed but never installed or shown to the public: Segments of his ,  portrait of Michael Jackson, that Jackson had commissioned Twitchell to do in 1990 for the side of the former Barker Bros. building in Hollywood, now the El Capitan Theatre, and also in the show was a repaint of his 1971 2-story mural of Steve McQueen.

Michael Jackson worked closely with Twitchell for three years on the Smooth Criminal Mural project. After the 1994 scandal, the mural had been put on pause, but interest resparked after his death in 2009.

In November 2009 Twitchell painted two murals on two pieces of the Berlin wall for the 20-year anniversary of the fall of the Berlin Wall. One was the portrait of John Kennedy, the other Ronald Reagan. They depicted the US Presidents at the beginning and the fall of the Berlin wall. Controversy ensued and Twitchell was disappointed when only one piece could fit in the installation as per the organizers of the exhibit. Twitchell decided to display half of each piece in the exhibit which worked out perfectly.

Twitchell's latest project in 2017 was a repaint of his Ed Ruscha monument, which is now permanently on The Historic American Hotel in the Arts District of Downtown Los Angeles.

Twitchell has received honorary doctorate degrees from Biola University, Otis College of Art and Design, and California State University, Los Angeles. He currently sits on the Board of Trustees at Otis College of Art and Design, is on the Board of Advisors at the Biola University Art Department and is an MFA Mentor at Laguna College of Art and Design.

Twitchell's wife died at the age of 64 on June 13, 2018 from a complication with a blood thinner she was prescribed. He now lives in Long Beach, California in the Belmont Heights district. His son, artist Artie Twitchell assists him on all his projects and has been working with him on installing and restoring all of his murals for the past several years. His daughter, Aurora Cruz is a neurosurgeon currently living in Louisville, Kentucky with her husband and children.

Well-known works

References

July 16, 2009,  Mercury News, "Jackson death revives interest in Twitchell mural."
April 2, 2009, Los Angeles Times, Haithman, Diane, "Kent Twitchell: Once there were murals."
May 1, 2008, Los Angeles Times, Haithman, Diane, "Artist Kent Twitchell settles suit over disappearing mural. The U.S. government is among 11 defendants who will pay $1.1 million after painting over the six-story 'Ed Ruscha monument.'"
March 21, 1992, Los Angeles Times, "Putting a Firewall Around Murals 'Old woman of the freeway' gets a new lease on life."
March 20, 1992, Los Angeles Times, Snow, Shauna, "Homecoming for Lady of the Freeway Art: Kent Twitchell's  mural will be restored as a result of a settlement ending more than four years of litigation."
October 16, 1991, Daily News, "LA Chamber Orchestra mural to conduct freeway traffic flow."
August 28, 1990,Los Angeles Times, Smith, Doug, "Muralist asks city to pay for whiteout."
March 4, 1990, Daily News, "Conservancy is out to save the murals."
July 28, 1989, Philadelphia Inquirer, "Planting a notion about art the anti-graffiti network hopes a muralist will inspire graffiti writers to find creative alternatives."
August 26, 1986, Los Angeles Times, Ito, Kai, "A tall tribute muralist toils to honor Ed Ruscha, key figure in contemporary L.A. art."
October 19, 1984, Los Angeles Times, Pincus, Robert, "Twitchell: The wedding of realism and belief."
May 20, 1984, Los Angeles Times, Auerbach, Michael, "Olympic '84 – Art from the fast lane."
February 19, 1980, Los Angeles Times, Muchnic, Suzanne, "Little people make it big with Twitchell."
February 19, 1980, Los Angeles Times, Elvenstar, Diane, "A larger-than-life painter- Painter's Art."
September 5, 1973, Los Angeles Times, Burke, Kathy, "Paints five-story picture by numbers- Artist up against wall on mammoth mural."
November 6, 2009, Los Angeles Times, Villarreal, Yvonne, "When the two halves of Berlin became whole again."
November 4, 2009, Associated Press, Rogers, John, "Berlin Wall drives wedge through LA art community."

External links
Kent Twitchell at KentTwitchell.org via Web Archive.
Kent Twitchell at LAartscene.org

 2008 by Otis students
Kent Twitchell video interview 2009 by Veronica Aberham of Studio Online

1942 births
Artists from Los Angeles
20th-century American painters
American male painters
21st-century American painters
21st-century American male artists
Living people
American muralists
Artists from Lansing, Michigan
People from Echo Park, Los Angeles
Otis College of Art and Design alumni
East Los Angeles College alumni
20th-century American male artists